Mark Lynch may refer to:

Mark Lynch (English footballer) (born 1981), English footballer
Mark Lynch (Gaelic footballer) (born 1986), Irish Gaelic footballer